Govandi is a Suburban in eastern Mumbai, Maharashtra. It is near to Chembur, Deonar and Vashi. The main public modes of transport are auto-rickshaws, taxi and bus. The closest railway station is Govandi railway station which is on the Harbour Line of the Mumbai Suburban Railway.
With Eastern Freeway (Shivaji Chowk entrance) and construction of BKC link road, this and its surrounding area are becoming easier to commute. In govandi have 2 Bus depot also known as old and new depot.

Sub localities

The sub localities are: Agarwadi Annabhau Sathe Nagar, Bhim Nagar, Dock Labour Board Colony, Mohite Nagar, New Gautam Nagar, Shivaji Nagar, Patwardhan Colony, Samrat Ashok Nagar, Sanjay Gandhi Nagar, Saras Baug, Sector 1, Sector 2, Shivneri Nagar building 1, Zakir Hussain Nagar, Simran Heights

See also
Mankhurd Shivaji Nagar (Vidhan Sabha constituency)
Deonar

References

Suburbs of Mumbai